OneNYC is the official strategic plan of New York City for development based on "principles of growth, equity, sustainability, and resiliency."  It was released in April 2015 as the successor document to PlaNYC and has been followed by yearly progress reports.

See also 
Climate change in New York City
Environmental issues in New York City
Urban planning

References

External links 
 
 OneNYC Progress Report 2018

Environment of the United States
Health campaigns
Government of New York City
Urban planning in New York City